Hugo Hermann Fürchtegott Treffner (17 July 1845 – 13 March 1912) was the founder and first director of the Hugo Treffner Gymnasium in Tartu, and an important figure in the Estonian national awakening.

Biography 

Hugo Treffner was born in a family of local parish clerk in Kanepi village. From 1868 to 1880 he studied philology and theology in the University of Tartu. While studying he also worked as a private teacher. In 1883, Treffner received the permission to open his own school - a progymnasium with three classes. He was director of Treffner Gymnasium for the rest of his life while he also worked as religion teacher in other schools. He died after several health problems in 1912 and is buried in the Raadi Cemetery in Tartu. Treffner was described by his contemporaries as a skilled politician who managed to get along with the Russian authorities very well for the benefits to his school.

Treffner actively took part in national movement, where he sided himself with Carl Robert Jakobson. He was a founding member of Estonian Students' Society and the Society of Estonian Literati as well as editor in various newspapers (Postimees among them).

Hugo Treffner inspired A. H. Tammsaare to create the character of "mister Maurus" in his second book of Truth and Justice. A statue of Hugo Treffner is situated at the bank of river Emajõgi in Tartu.

Sources 
 Ülo Kaevats et al. 1996. Eesti Entsüklopeedia 9. Tallinn: Eesti Entsüklopeediakirjastus,

External links
 
 Hugo Treffner

1845 births
1912 deaths
People from Kanepi Parish
People from the Governorate of Livonia
Estonian schoolteachers
University of Tartu alumni
Burials at Raadi cemetery